Joan Constance Hatcher (4 November 1923 – 24 September 2006) was a New Zealand cricketer who played as a right-handed batter. She appeared in four Test matches for New Zealand between 1948 and 1954. She played domestic cricket for Wellington.

References

External links
 
 

1923 births
2006 deaths
Cricketers from Wellington City
New Zealand women cricketers
New Zealand women Test cricketers
Wellington Blaze cricketers